"Wolf Like Me" is the first single from American art rock band TV on the Radio's album Return to Cookie Mountain, released in the United Kingdom on July 25, 2006 on 4AD. The single's B-side was the song "Things You Can Do", which was also available as a bonus track on the U.S. release of Return to Cookie Mountain. It was released in two formats: CD single and 7-inch vinyl.

The song is the band's most successful single in the United States, where it peaked at #37 on the Billboard Hot Modern Rock Tracks chart in 2006. It was also their second top 100 hit in the UK where it peaked at #89.

Personnel
On "Wolf Like Me":
 Vocals - Tunde Adebimpe, Kyp Malone, Katrina Ford
 Drums - Jaleel Bunton
 Bass, guitar - Kyp Malone
 Guitar, samples, synth - Dave Sitek
 Guitar - Jaleel Bunton
 Baritone saxophone - Martin Perna

Music video
The music video for "Wolf Like Me" starring poet Beau Sia was directed by Jon Watts and mixes two cinematic styles: black-and-white silent film and 1980s B-movie. America's Next Top Model cycle 4 winner Naima Mora was also featured in the video.

Reception
Wolf Like Me was voted in at number 63 in the Triple J Hottest 100, 2006, and at number 99 in the Triple J Hottest 100 of All Time, 2009. In October 2011, NME placed "Wolf Like Me" at number 46 on its list "150 Best Tracks of the Past 15 Years".

In popular culture

The song was featured in several racing video games Project Gotham Racing 4, Need for Speed: ProStreet, Driver: San Francisco, and The Crew, as well is a playable song on Battle of the Bands and Guitar Hero 5. The song was featured in the 2008 film Never Back Down. In January 2010 it was used in a TV commercial (Destiny - Force Fate) by Nike to promote the 2010 Winter Olympics. In October 2022, the song was featured in the stop-motion animated film Wendell & Wild.

Charts

References

2006 singles
TV on the Radio songs
4AD singles
2006 songs
Songs written by Dave Sitek
Songs about werewolves